Natalia Reyes Gaitán (born 6 February 1987) is a Colombian actress known for her starring role in Terminator: Dark Fate (2019).  Before that, she was known in Latin America for her role in Birds of Passage (2018); and for starring on the Sony Pictures Television series Lady, la vendedora de rosas. She is also known in her native country for other television shows such as Isa TK+, Dulce amor, and Cumbia Ninja on Fox.

Personal life
In 2009, Reyes met Juan Pedro San Segundo in Cartagena when Juan was the organizer of a music festival at the time. They married in 2016.

In May 2021, Reyes announced that they were expecting their first child.

Filmography

Film

Television

References

External links
 

Living people
Colombian telenovela actresses
Colombian film actresses
21st-century Colombian actresses
1987 births